Hungarian football clubs have participated in European association football competitions (UEFA Champions League/European Cup, Europa League/UEFA Cup/Inter-Cities Fairs Cup, and defunct UEFA Cup Winners Cup) since their inception in 1955, when MTK, Vasas SC and Budapest Honvéd FC played in the inaugural Inter-Cities Fairs Cup.  

The only Hungarian club to have won a major European trophy is Ferencváros, having defeated Juventus 1–0 in Turin to lift the Inter-Cities Fairs Cup 1964-65. 

Teams representing Hungary's NB I have reached the final of a major European competition on six separate occasions, with Ferencváros having done so thrice, thus being the only multiple time finalist, and the only team to reach the final in different competitions. Hungarian football clubs appearing in major European finals, in chronological order: 

During the historical European Cup era, three clubs succeeded in reaching the semi-final stage of the competition, each on one occasion. In the 1957-58 season Vasas Budapest; in the 1964-65 season Győr; and in the 1973-74 season Újpest. 

In the modern Champions League era, under the current format, Hungarian clubs have qualified for the group stage on three separate occasions: Ferencváros twice, in the 1995-96 then 2020-21 seasons,   as well as Debrecen in the 2009–10 season.

Ferencváros finished at the top of their group in the 2022–23 UEFA Europa League, resulting in their progress into the knockout phase, marking the first time since Vidi's defeat at the hands of Real Madrid in the  1985 UEFA Cup Final that a Hungarian club has reached the latter portion of a major European tournament.

Statistics

 Most European Cup/Champions League competitions appeared in: 14 – Ferencváros 
 Most UEFA Cup/Europa League competitions appeared in: 11 – 
 Most Cup Winners' Cup competitions appeared in: 2 – 
 Most Intertoto Cup competitions appeared in: 5 – 
 Most competitions appeared in overall: 22 – 
 First match played: Vörös Lobogó SE 6–3 Anderlecht (1955–56 European Cup R1)
 Most matches played: 72 – 
 Most match wins: 21 – 
 Most match draws: 17 –
 Most match losses: 39 – 

 Biggest win (match): ? goals
  6–0  (2005–06 UEFA Champions League QR1) 
  6–0  (2010–11 UEFA Europa League QR1) 
  6–0  (2017–18 UEFA Europa League QR1) 
 Biggest win (aggregate): ? goals
  11–0  (2010–11 UEFA Europa League QR1) 
 Biggest defeat (match): ? goals
  7–0  (1998 UEFA Intertoto Cup R2)
 Biggest defeat (aggregate): ? goals
  0–11  (2005–06 UEFA Cup QR2)

As of 8 August 2018.

Who qualifies for UEFA competitions

European champions

UEFA coefficient and ranking
For the 2023–24 UEFA competitions, the associations will be allocated places according to their 2022 UEFA country coefficients, which will take into account their performance in European competitions from 2017–18 to 2021–22. In the 2022 rankings that will be used for the 2023–24 European competitions, Hungary's coefficient points total is 16.375. After earning a score of 2.750 during the 2021–22 European campaign, Hungary is ranked by UEFA as the 27th best association in Europe out of 55.

 25  17.125
 26  17.000
 27  16.375
 28  15.875
 29  15.750
 Full list

UEFA country coefficient history
(As of 2 September 2022), Source: Bert Kassies website.

Full European record

UEFA Champions League/European Cup

Notes
 Note 1: Feyenoord beat Vasas 1–0 in a playoff to qualify for the quarter-finals of the 1962-63 European Cup.
 Note 2: A number of Eastern European clubs withdrew from the first two rounds when UEFA paired up all of the Eastern European clubs against one another.
 Note 3: Vidi played their home match at Pancho Aréna and Groupama Arena due to the reconstruction of Sóstói Stadion.
 SF: Semi-final
 QF: Quarter-final
 GS: Group stage
 R: Round
 QR: Qualifying round
 PR: Preliminary round
 PO: Play-off round

Inter-Cities Fairs Cup/UEFA Cup/UEFA Europa League

Notes
 Note 3: Debrecen was eliminated in the third round of the 2014-15 UEFA Champions League. Therefore, they were eligible for entering the 2014–15 UEFA Europa League play-off round.
 Note 4: Videoton was eliminated in the third round of the 2015-16 UEFA Champions League. Therefore, they were eligible for entering the 2015–16 UEFA Europa League play-off round.
 Note 5: Videoton FC played their home match at Pancho Aréna, Felcsút, due to the reconstruction of their own stadium, Sóstói Stadion.
 Note 6: MTK Budapest FC played their home match at Ménfői úti Stadion, Győr, due to the reconstruction of their own stadium, Hidegkuti Nándor Stadion.
 Note 7: Vasas SC played their home match at Szusza Ferenc Stadion due to the reconstruction of their stadium, Illovszky Rudolf Stadion.
 Note 8: Vidi were eliminated in the play-off round of the 2018-19 UEFA Champions League. Therefore, they were eligible for entering the 2018–19 UEFA Europa League group stage.
 Note 9: Ferencváros were eliminated in the third round of the 2019–20 UEFA Champions League. Therefore, they were eligible for entering the play-off stage of the 2019–20 UEFA Europa League.
 Note 10: Ferencváros were eliminated in the Play-off round of the 2021–22 UEFA Champions League. Therefore, they were eligible for entering the group stage of the 2021–22 UEFA Europa League.
 Note 11: Ferencváros were eliminated in the third round of the 2022–23 UEFA Champions League. Therefore, they were eligible for entering the play-off stage of the 2022–23 UEFA Europa League.

UEFA Europa Conference League

Records and statistics
European Cup/Champions League

Notes
Note 1: Group stage exists only in the UEFA Champions League era from 1992-93

Inter-cities Fairs Cup/UEFA Cup/Europa League

Notes
Note 1: Group stage existed from the UEFA Cup 2004-05 season and in the Europa League era

UEFA Cup Winners' Cup

References

 
European football clubs in international competitions